The  is a professional wrestling championship created and promoted by the Japanese promotion DDT Pro-Wrestling (DDT). Open to anyone, regardless of gender or DDT employment status, the championship is defended "24/7", as in any time, anywhere, as long as a referee is there to confirm the win. Because of this rule, not only is the championship winnable regardless of gender or number of individuals (in case of a common pinfall or submission), it is also available to "unconventional" champions such as animals or inanimate objects, with title changes regularly occurring outside of regular shows, often with videos posted on the promotion's social media accounts. It was created as a parody of the defunct WWE Hardcore Championship, which also had a "24/7 rule".

The championship was introduced on the June 29, 2000 TV taping, during which Poison Julie Sawada created the title and awarded it to himself, only to lose it in under three minutes after Mitsunobu Kikuzawa attacked him with the belt and successfully pinned him. The current champion is Akito.

There have been 1,563 officially recognized reigns between 395 different human individuals, 7 teams and 44 inanimate objects and animals. The record for most reigns is held by Shinobu, who won it 216 times, including by trading the title back-and-forth with 215-time champion Yuko Miyamoto a total of 303 times on the same night. Danshoku Dino holds the record for longest combined reign with at least 448 days and counting (the exact date of when he won his tenth title is uncertain). Masa Takanashi's sixth reign is the longest singular reign at 333 days. Only 142 individuals have held the title for longer than a day. The title has occasionally been won by unusual means, such as an auction for the belt, rock–paper–scissors, and even a title change that occurred in a dream. On February 6, 2022, DDT's YouTube channel hit the 100,000 subscribers milestone and the tablet which showed the moment pinned former champion Mao so all the hundred thousand subscribers were considered champions.

Non-wrestlers to have held the title include AV idol Nao Saejima, TV personality LiLiCo, J-pop idols Akari Suda, Kaori Matsumura, Yuki Arai, Rise Shiokawa, Aika Sawaguchi, Misaki Natsumi, Momomi Wagatsuma and Lingling, a cat, a monkey, a ladder, Vince McMahon's Hollywood Walk of Fame star, and the title belt itself. One team, The Young Bucks, have won the title itself and their autobiography also won the title.

Title history

Combined reigns

Individual wrestlers

This list contains the combined reigns of all male/female wrestlers who held the title for a known duration. Some names may appear more than once in the teams list underneath completed by the combined days held and times won in this one.

Teams

Inanimate objects, animals, etc.

See also

WWE Hardcore Championship – a title with a similar 24/7 rule
WWE 24/7 Championship – another title with a similar 24/7 rule

Notes

References

External links

	DDT Iron Man Heavy Metal Championship

DDT Pro-Wrestling
DDT Pro-Wrestling championships